Pedro Cassunda Domingos known as Fofana  (born April 3, 1982) is a former Angolan football player. He has played for Angola national team.

National team statistics

References

Atlético Sport Aviação players
S.L. Benfica (Luanda) players
Girabola players
1982 births
Living people
Angolan footballers
Angola international footballers
Association football midfielders